The Institute of Standards and Industrial Research of Iran (ISIRI) is the Iranian governmental institution for standardization and certification. It is the Iranian representative to International Organization for Standardization.

See also 
Industry of Iran
List of ISIRI standards

References

External links 

1960 establishments in Iran
ISO member bodies
Government agencies of Iran
Organizations established in 1960
Standards organisations in Iran
Ministry of Industry, Mine and Trade (Iran)